Iain Lewers (born 5 January 1984) is a field hockey player from Northern Ireland who represented Ireland, England and Great Britain at international level. He represented Great Britain at the 2012 and 2016 Summer Olympics. He was also a member the England teams that won bronze medals at the 2011 Men's EuroHockey Nations Championship and 2014 Commonwealth Games. He also represented England at the 2013 and 2015 Men's EuroHockey Nations Championships and at the 2014 Men's Hockey World Cup. In both 2014 and 2015 Lewers was named the England/Great Britain Player of the Year by the Hockey Writers' Club.

Early years and education
Lewers was educated at Cairnshill Primary School, Wellington College Belfast, and Ulster University where he gained a Bachelor's degree in Sports Science and Management.

Domestic teams

Annadale
As a youth Lewers played for Annadale. He was also a member of the Annadale team that won five Ulster Senior League titles between 2002–03 and 2006–07. Lewers also scored for Annadale in the 2006–07 Irish Senior Cup final as they lost 4–3 to Glenanne. His father, David Dewers, had played for Annadale in the 1984 Irish Senior Cup final.
While playing for Annadale, Iain Lewers also represented Ulster at interprovincial level.

HGC
Between 2007 and 2010 Lewers played for HGC in the Hoofdklasse. Together with John Jermyn and Barry Middleton, he was a member of the HGC team that finished as runners up in the 2007–08 Euro Hockey League. He also helped HGC finish as runners-up in the 2009–10 Hoofdklasse.

Men's England Hockey League
Lewers played for several clubs in the Men's England Hockey League including  Loughborough, East Grinstead,  Holcombe and Wimbledon.

Hockey India League
Lewers also played in the Hockey India League. In 2014 he played for Uttar Pradesh Wizards. At the 2014 auction he was initially selected as a replacement. However, due to injuries he was subsequently called up to play the season. During the 2016 and 2017 seasons he played for Delhi Waveriders.

International

Ireland
Between 2004 and 2008 Lewers made 88 senior appearances for Ireland. He made his senior debut for Ireland in a 2004 Celtic Cup match against Wales. He had previously represented Ireland at under-16 and under-18 levels. He was a member of the Ireland team that won the 2005 Men's EuroHockey Nations Trophy. He also represented Ireland at the 2006 Men's Intercontinental Cup, the 2007 Men's EuroHockey Nations Championship, and at the 2008 Men's Field Hockey Olympic Qualifier. In July 2008 the Irish Hockey Association announced that Lewers was switching allegiances from Ireland to England/Great Britain.

Great Britain
Between 2011 and 2016  Lewers made 72 senior appearances for Great Britain. Having previously played for Ireland, Lewers had to wait for three years before he was eligible to play for Great Britain. He eventually made his Great Britain debut against Malaysia at the 2011 Sultan Azlan Shah Cup. He subsequently represented Great Britain at the 2012 and 2016 Summer Olympics

England
Between 2011 and 2016 Lewers made 74 senior appearances for England. He made his senior debut for England in June 2011 against Pakistan. He was subsequently a member the England teams that won bronze medals at the 2011 Men's EuroHockey Nations Championship and 2014 Commonwealth Games. He also represented England at the 2013 and 2015 Men's EuroHockey Nations Championships and at the 2014 Men's Hockey World Cup. In both 2014 and 2015 Lewers was named the England/Great Britain Player of the Year by the Hockey Writers' Club.

Personal life
Since 2012 Lewers has been in a relationship with Georgie Twigg, the England/Great Britain women's international. In 2019 they became engaged.

Honours
Great Britain
Men's Four Nations Cup
Runners up: 2016
England
Men's Hockey Investec Cup
Winners: 2014
Hockey Champions Trophy
Runners up: 2012
Ireland
Men's EuroHockey Nations Trophy
Winners: 2005
HGC
Euro Hockey League
Runners up: 2007–08
Hoofdklasse
Runners up: 2009–10
Annadale
Ulster Senior League
Winners: 2002–03, 2003–04, 2004–05, 2005–06, 2006–07
Kirk Cup
Winners: 2003–04
Irish Senior Cup
Runners Up: 2006–07

References

External links
 

1984 births
Living people
English male field hockey players
Olympic field hockey players of Great Britain
British male field hockey players
Ireland international men's field hockey players
Male field hockey players from Northern Ireland
Irish male field hockey players
Field hockey players at the 2012 Summer Olympics
Field hockey players at the 2016 Summer Olympics
2014 Men's Hockey World Cup players
Field hockey players at the 2014 Commonwealth Games
Commonwealth Games bronze medallists for England
Commonwealth Games medallists in field hockey
Loughborough Students field hockey players
East Grinstead Hockey Club players
Holcombe Hockey Club players
Wimbledon Hockey Club players
Uttar Pradesh Wizards players
Delhi Waveriders players
HGC players
Men's England Hockey League players
Hockey India League players
Men's Hoofdklasse Hockey players
Expatriate field hockey players
Expatriate sportspeople from Northern Ireland in the Netherlands
Irish expatriate sportspeople in England
Expatriate sportspeople from Northern Ireland in India
Sportspeople from Belfast
People educated at Wellington College Belfast
Alumni of Ulster University
Medallists at the 2014 Commonwealth Games